Kriens Mattenhof railway station is a Swiss railway station in the municipality of Kriens in the canton of Lucerne. It is on the Brünig line of the Zentralbahn railway company, which links Lucerne and Interlaken, and is also used by trains of the Luzern–Stans–Engelberg line.

Immediately to the north of Kriens Mattenhof station, the railway enters a tunnel as far as the approaches to Lucerne station, calling at the underground Lucerne Allmend/Messe station on the way. This tunnel opened in November 2012, replacing a less direct surface alignment.

Services 
 the following services stop at Kriens Mattenhof:

References

External links 
 
 

Railway stations in the canton of Lucerne
Zentralbahn stations